Daniel Reese (26 January 1879 – 12 June 1953) was a New Zealand cricketer.

Biography
Reese was a son of Christchurch businessman, Member of Parliament and former rower Dan Reese. He was born in Christchurch in 1879 and received his education at West Christchurch School.

A left-handed batsman and a slow-medium bowler, Reese first represented his national team aged 19. His early cricket was with the Midland club in Christchurch and his provincial team, Canterbury. He left New Zealand to play for Melbourne Cricket Club from 1900 to 1903 before continuing to England. In England he played for London County and Essex. Plum Warner rated him as among the greatest fielders of all time.

He returned to New Zealand, and captained Canterbury from 1907 to 1921, and New Zealand from 1907 to 1914, including the tour to Australia in 1913–14. His highest first-class score was 148, out of a team total of 274, for New Zealand against Lord Hawke's XI in 1902–03. His best bowling figures were 7 for 53 for the New Zealanders against Queensland in Brisbane in 1913–14.

After his playing days he was involved in cricket administration, serving as president of the Canterbury Cricket Association and the New Zealand Cricket Council.

When Tom Lowry was president of the New Zealand Cricket Council he made a speech in 1952 in which he declared that Reese was one of New Zealand's "five greatest cricketers", along with Syd Hiddleston, Martin Donnelly, Bert Sutcliffe and Jack Cowie.

Reese managed the Golden Bay Cement Works in Tarakohe for three years.

Reese died in Christchurch on 12 June 1953.

References

External links

Was it all Cricket? the autobiography of Reese at NZETC
 
 Dan Reese at the New Zealand Sports Hall of Fame

1879 births
1953 deaths
Canterbury cricketers
Essex cricketers
New Zealand cricket administrators
New Zealand cricketers
Pre-1930 New Zealand representative cricketers
Melbourne Cricket Club cricketers
London County cricketers
Cricket historians and writers
South Island cricketers